The M class are a class of diesel-hydraulic locomotives built by Walkers Limited, Maryborough for the Western Australian Government Railways in 1972–1973.

History
Walkers Limited had previously supplied similar locomotives to the Emu Bay Railway (as the 11 class), Queensland Railways (as the DH class) and the New South Wales Government Railways (as the 73 class).

The first two members were purchased for use in hump shunting at Forrestfield yard. In 1973 a further three were purchased. These differed in having Caterpillar engines, were much lighter and could operate in multiple with each other. These were designated as the MA class. In January 1994, four were written off and later sold to CSR for use on its sugar cane railways in Queensland. MA1862 remained in service with Transperth as the Claisebrook depot shunter until 2014. In 2015, it was sold to the Hotham Valley Railway.

In 1996, M1851 was sold and returned to Walkers for conversion to a  locomotive for further use hauling sugar trains in Queensland. It remained in service in 2014.

References

External links

B-B locomotives
Diesel-hydraulic locomotives of Australia
Diesel locomotives of Western Australia
Railway locomotives introduced in 1972
Walkers Limited locomotives
3 ft 6 in gauge locomotives of Australia
610 mm gauge locomotives